Giuseppe Baronchelli (born 9 March 1971) is an Italian association football coach and former professional player who manages Montichiari in Serie D.

Career
During his playing career, Baronchelli played as a defender for Ospitaletto, Palazzolo, Brescia, Lucchese, Fiorenzuola, Lecce, Albacete, Cesena, Catania, Fiorentina, Pro Sesto, Caravaggese and Montichiari.

While in Brescia, he received death threats and was attacked on the street due to his team's bad performance in the 1994–95 Serie A.

References

1971 births
Living people
Italian footballers
Italian football managers
Albacete Balompié players
A.C. Montichiari managers
Serie A players
Serie B players
Serie C players
Serie D players
Segunda División players
S.S.D. Lucchese 1905 players
S.S.D. Pro Sesto players
U.S. Fiorenzuola 1922 S.S. players
A.C. Montichiari players
Brescia Calcio players
A.C. Cesena players
U.S. Lecce players
Catania S.S.D. players
ACF Fiorentina players
Italian expatriate footballers
Expatriate footballers in Spain
Association football defenders